In Greek mythology, Briseus (Ancient Greek: Βρισεύς) or Brises (Ancient Greek: Βρίσης) is the father of Briseis (Hippodameia), a maiden captured by the Greeks during the Trojan War, as recorded in the Iliad.  Eustathius of Thessalonica, a commentator on Homer, says Briseus and Chryses were brothers, as sons of Ardys (otherwise unknown), with Briseus dwelling in Pedasus, and Chryses residing in Chryse; both were towns in the Troad. Pedasus was said by Homer to be Lelegian settlement, ruled by the Lelegian king Altes. Thus, Briseus may also have been a Lelegian.  Other sources say that Briseus was a priest of Lyrnessus. According to Dictys Cretensis, Briseus hanged himself when he lost his daughter.

Notes

Characters in the Iliad

References 

 Dictys Cretensis, from The Trojan War. The Chronicles of Dictys of Crete and Dares the Phrygian translated by Richard McIlwaine Frazer, Jr. (1931-). Indiana University Press. 1966. Online version at the Topos Text Project.
 Homer, The Iliad with an English Translation by A.T. Murray, Ph.D. in two volumes. Cambridge, MA., Harvard University Press; London, William Heinemann, Ltd. 1924. . Online version at the Perseus Digital Library.
 Homer, Homeri Opera in five volumes. Oxford, Oxford University Press. 1920. . Greek text available at the Perseus Digital Library.

Greek mythology of Anatolia